Aspall and Thorndon  was a railway station on the Mid-Suffolk Light Railway. This station was located with Aspall to the south, Debenham 2.5 miles further south and Thorndon 3.5 miles to the north-east.

History

Opened by the Mid-Suffolk Light Railway, Aspall station was located eight miles from Haughley and had a similar sized building to Mendlesham but the station was the only one on the line not to have an open-fronted waiting room.

References 

Comfort, N. A. (1986) The Mid-Suffolk Light Railway, The Oakwood Press. 
Paye, P. (1986) The Mid-Suffolk Light Railway, Wild Swan Publications Ltd. 

Disused railway stations in Suffolk
Former Mid-Suffolk Light Railway stations
Railway stations in Great Britain opened in 1908
Railway stations in Great Britain closed in 1952
1908 establishments in England